Yorgos Mavropsaridis (born 21 November 1954) is a Greek film editor. He is well known for his collaborations with Yorgos Lanthimos, having edited all his films to date. He is a graduate of the London Film School, and honed his skills working in commercials. He has been nominated for the Academy Award for Best Film Editing for his work on The Favourite.

References

External links

1954 births
Living people
Greek film editors
Film people from Athens
Alumni of the London Film School